Dental plexus may refer to:

 Inferior dental plexus, a nerve plexus which supplies the lower jaw
 Superior dental plexus, a nerve plexus which supplies the upper jaw